Triple Nickel, Triple Nickels or Triple Nickles may refer to:

Warren Elliott Blackwell, I (1951-2018)
555th Engineer Brigade (United States) 
555th Parachute Infantry Battalion (United States), aka "Triple Nickles" 
555th Fighter Squadron, part of the United States 31st Fighter Wing
555 Field Artillery Battalion, part of the United States 5th Infantry Regiment
Triple Nickel Books, published by Solomon Gelman
555 timer IC, an integrated circuit popular with hobbyists
Triple Nickel lift at Bluewood Ski Area
College Eye EC-121D, a Lockheed EC-121 Warning Star aircraft 
555th Mobile Infantry Regiment, an elite military unit in John Ringo's Legacy of the Aldenata series
Interstate 555, a highway in Arkansas
N555GT, a Piper Navajo aircraft based out of Norwood Massachusetts